Émile Roumer (5 February 1903 - April 1988) was a Haitian poet.  Roumer wrote mostly satirical poems and poems dealing with love and nature. Born in Jérémie, he was educated in France before studying business in Manchester, England.

Bibliography

 Poèmes d'Haïti et de France (1925)
 Poèmes en Vers (1947)
 Le Caïman Etoilé (1963)
 Rosaire Couronne Sonnets (1964)

Death
Roumer died in Frankfurt, Germany in April 1988.

References

Notes
 

1903 births
1988 deaths
Haitian male poets
20th-century Haitian poets
20th-century male writers
Haitian expatriates in France
Haitian expatriates in the United Kingdom